Marta Canessa de Monserrat (born December 16, 1936 Montevideo) is a Uruguayan historian, academic and writer. Canessa, the wife of former President Julio María Sanguinetti, served as the First Lady of Uruguay for two non-consecutive terms - 1985 to 1990 and 1995 until 2000.

Biography

Canessa was member of the Commission special permanent of the city old in Montevideo during 15 years. Also was member of the Council honorary of the works of preservation and reconstruction of it Colonia del Sacramento, which was later declared heritage of the humanity by Unesco.

Personal life
She is the daughter of María de Montserrat, a writer.

Selected work
Rivera: un Oriental Liso y Llano (Ediciones de la Banda Oriental, Montevideo. 1976)
Ciudad Vieja de Montevideo
El Bien Nacer. Limpieza de Oficios y Limpieza de Sangre. Raíces Ibéricas de un Mal Latinoamericano. Montevideo, Alfaguara, 2000.

Bibliography

References

Living people
1936 births
People from Montevideo
Uruguayan women essayists
20th-century Uruguayan historians
First Ladies of Uruguay
Julio María Sanguinetti
Women historians
Dames Grand Cross of the Order of Isabella the Catholic